The Deutscher Anglerverband (DAV) was an association of anglers in Germany that existed from 1958 until 2013. Until German reunification in 1990, the DAV was the governing body for the sport of angling in East Germany and was a constituent organization within the Deutscher Turn- und Sportbund. After reunification the DAV expanded into the formerly West German states.

In 2013, the DAV merged with the Verband Deutscher Sportfischer (VDSF) to form the Deutscher Angelfischerverband, thus uniting the two main angling organizations in the country.

References

Recreational fishing organizations
Sports governing bodies in Germany
Sports governing bodies in East Germany
Sports organizations established in 1958
1958 establishments in East Germany
2013 disestablishments in Germany